Below are lists of films produced in Hong Kong in the 2010s.

List of Hong Kong films of 2010
List of Hong Kong films of 2011
List of Hong Kong films of 2012
List of Hong Kong films of 2013
List of Hong Kong films of 2014
List of Hong Kong films of 2015
List of Hong Kong films of 2016
List of Hong Kong films of 2017
List of Hong Kong films of 2018
List of Hong Kong films of 2019

See also
List of films set in Hong Kong

External links
 IMDB list of Hong Kong films

Films
Hong Kong